The Dravinja is the largest tributary of the Drava River in Slovenia. Its source is on the Pohorje Massif southwest of Mount Rogla about 1,150 m above sea level. The river passes Zreče, the town of Slovenske Konjice, the ruins of the fort at Zbelovo, Poljčane, Makole, Štatenberg Castle, Majšperk, and Videm pri Ptuju, where it merges with the Drava. Its main tributary is the Polskava River.

The Dravinja is the best-preserved lowland river in Slovenia and has been protected as part of the European Natura 2000 network. In addition, the river is distinguished by the Pečnik Mill, which has been proclaimed an ethnological monument.

References

External links

 Condition of Dravinja - graphs, in the following order, of water level, flow and temperature data for the past 30 days (taken in Loče by ARSO)

Rivers of Styria (Slovenia)